This is a list of current and former on air staff (i.e. meteorologists and or weather presenters) for the ITV plc produced ITV Weather broadcasts which are transmitted on ITV.

ITV National Weather

Current on air staff
Alex Beresford
Good Morning Britain relief and ITV Evening News lead (2007–)
Jo Blythe 
(2006–2008, 2018, 2021–)
Des Coleman
Good Morning Britain relief (2020–) 
Amanda Houston
(2014–) 
Manali Lukha 
also Head of ITV Weather (2006–) 
Becky Mantin
(2004–)
Laura Tobin
Good Morning Britain lead (2012–)
Lucy Verasamy
(2012–)

Former on air staff
Martyn Davies
(1989–2012)
Richard Edgar
(1992–1993)
Fiona Farrell
(1995–1997)
Laura Greene 
(1995–1998)
John Hammond
(1997–2003)
Alex Hill
(1989–1995)
Siân Lloyd
(1990–2014)
Robin McCallum
(2002–2005)
Jon Mitchell
(2006–2008)
Angie Phillips
(1993–1995)
Chrissie Reidy
(2001–2005)
Trish Williamson
(1989–1990)

ITV plc nations and regions

Current on air staff
Jo Blythe
Granada Reports (2001–) 
Des Coleman
ITV News Central (2016–) 
Aisling Creevey
ITV News Anglia and UTV Live (2017–) 
Ruth Dodsworth
Wales at Six (2000–) 
Philippa Drew:
ITV News Meridian (2005–) 
Rita Fitzgerald
UTV Live
Kerrie Gosney
Calendar (2002–) 
Holly Green
ITV News Meridian (2017–) 
Amanda Houston
(2008–)
Ross Hutchinson
ITV News Tyne Tees and Lookaround (2010–) 
Emma Jesson
Granada Reports (1992–)
Shireen Jordan
ITV News Channel TV (2022–)
Tori Lacey
Calendar, Granada Reports, ITV News Tyne Tees & Lookaround (2023–)
Chris Page
ITV News Anglia (2017–) 
Helen Plint
(2012–)
Charlie Powell
ITV News West Country (2018–) 
Louise Small
UTV Live (2021–) 
Sally Williams
ITN for ITV News London (2019–) 
James Wright
(2002–)

Former on air staff
Genelle Aldred
ITV News Central (2014–2015)
Louise Beale
ITV News Anglia
 Alex Beresford
ITV News West Country (2005–2022) 
Sophia Bird
ITV News Channel TV (2005–2022) 
Helen Carnell
ITV News Tyne Tees and Lookaround (2011)
Luke Castiglione
ITV News Meridian (2012–2017)
Anna Church
ITV News Central
Bob Crampton
ITV News West Country (2008–2018)
Gillian Davies
ITV News West Country (2006–2013)
Martyn Davies
ITV News Meridian (2004–2012)
Dan Downs
ITV News West Country (1996–2012)
Carl Edwards
Wales at Six (2013–2014)
Sarah Farmer
ITV News Meridian (2009)
Nazaneen Ghaffar
The West Tonight
Karin Giannone
ITV News Anglia (1999)
Simon Gilbert
Calendar (2003)
Peter Griffin
ITV News West Country (1993–2013)
Steve Hadley
Calendar (2004–2005)
Kate Haskell
ITV News West Country (1998–2022) 
Lucy Holleron
ITV News Central (2009–2016)
David Hughes
ITV News Anglia
Gemma Humphries
ITV News Meridian (2000–2009)
Wendy Hurrell
ITV News Anglia (2004–2008)
Becky Jago
ITV News Anglia (1999–2001)
Bob Johnson
ITV News Tyne Tees (1991–2008)
Lara Lewington
ITV News London (2010)
Kate Lewis
Wales at Six (2014–2018)
Debbie Lindley
Calendar (1996–2009)
Rachel Mackley
ITV News Anglia (2008–2010)
Beki Mahon
ITV News Central (2008)
Becky Mantin
ITV News Anglia (2002–2005)
Robin McCallum
ITV News London (2005–2012)
Adian McGivern
ITV News Anglia: (2013–2016)
Claire McGlasson
ITV News Anglia
Frank Mitchell
UTV Live (1993–2021)
Jon Mitchell
Calendar (1989–2022)
Clare Nasir
ITV News Anglia  (1997–2000), ITV News London (2010–2013)
Charlie Neil
ITV News Central (1992–2009)
Simon Parkin
ITV News Meridian (2006–2017)
Alice Piper
ITV News Anglia (2010–2017)
Amanda Piper
ITV News Meridian
Kesley Redmore
Wales at Six (2017–2022)
Chrissie Reidy
ITV News London (2005–2009)
Martin Stew: ITV News London (2012–2019)
Fred Talbot
Granada Reports  (2009–2012)
Sara Thornton
ITV News Anglia (2002–2008)
Philippa Tomson
ITV News Tyne Tees and Lookaround (2009–2012)
Alex Watson
ITV News Tyne Tees and Lookaround (2009–2010, 2012)

Notes
Most regional weather presenters sometimes provide the weather for more than one region.

See also
List of ITV News on air staff

References

External links
ITV National Weather at itv.com
Meet the ITV Weather team across the UK at itv.com, 28 November 2022
ITV Anglia Weather at itv.com
ITV Border Weather at itv.com
ITV Calendar Weather at itv.com
ITV Channel Weather at itv.com
ITV Central Weather at itv.com
ITV Granada Weather at itv.com
ITV London Weather at itv.com
ITV Meridian Weather at itv.com
ITV Tyne Tees Weather at itv.com
ITV Wales Weather at itv.com
ITV West Country Weather at itv.com
UTV Weather at itv.com

ITV Weather on air staff
ITV Weather on air staff
ITV Weather